Domajinci (Prekmurje Slovene: Domaginci) is a village in the Municipality of Cankova in the Prekmurje region of northeastern Slovenia.

There is a small chapel in the settlement. It was built in 1880.

References

External links 
Domajinci on Geopedia

Populated places in the Municipality of Cankova